Red Hat, Inc. is an American software company that provides open source software products to enterprises and is a subsidiary of IBM. Founded in 1993, Red Hat has its corporate headquarters in Raleigh, North Carolina, with other offices worldwide.

Red Hat has become associated to a large extent with its enterprise operating system Red Hat Enterprise Linux. With the acquisition of open-source enterprise middleware vendor JBoss, Red Hat also offers Red Hat Virtualization (RHV), an enterprise virtualization product. Red Hat provides storage, operating system platforms, middleware, applications, management products, and support, training, and consulting services.

Red Hat creates, maintains, and contributes to many free software projects. It has acquired several proprietary software product codebases through corporate mergers and acquisitions and has released such software under open source licenses. , Red Hat is the second largest corporate contributor to the Linux kernel version 4.14 after Intel.

On October 28, 2018, IBM announced its intent to acquire Red Hat for $34 billion. The acquisition closed on July 9, 2019. It now operates as an independent subsidiary.

History
In 1993, Bob Young incorporated the ACC Corporation, a catalog business that sold Linux and Unix software accessories. In 1994, Marc Ewing created his own Linux distribution, which he named Red Hat Linux (associated with the time Ewing wore a red Cornell University lacrosse hat, given to him by his grandfather, while attending Carnegie Mellon University). Ewing released the software in October, and it became known as the Halloween release. Young bought Ewing's business in 1995, and the two merged to become Red Hat Software, with Young serving as chief executive officer (CEO).

Red Hat went public on August 11, 1999, achieving—at the time—the eighth-biggest first-day gain in the history of Wall Street. Matthew Szulik succeeded Bob Young as CEO in December of that year. Bob Young went on to found the online print on demand and self-publishing company, Lulu in 2002.

On November 15, 1999, Red Hat acquired Cygnus Solutions. Cygnus provided commercial support for free software and housed maintainers of GNU software products such as the GNU Debugger and GNU Binutils. One of the founders of Cygnus, Michael Tiemann, became the chief technical officer of Red Hat and  the vice president of open-source affairs. Later Red Hat acquired WireSpeed, C2Net and Hell's Kitchen Systems.

In February 2000, InfoWorld awarded Red Hat its fourth consecutive "Operating System Product of the Year" award for Red Hat Linux 6.1. Red Hat acquired Planning Technologies, Inc. in 2001 and AOL's iPlanet directory and certificate-server software in 2004.

Red Hat moved its headquarters from Durham to North Carolina State University's Centennial Campus in Raleigh, North Carolina in February 2002. In the following month Red Hat introduced Red Hat Linux Advanced Server, later renamed Red Hat Enterprise Linux (RHEL). Dell, IBM, HP and Oracle Corporation announced their support of the platform.

In December 2005, CIO Insight magazine conducted its annual "Vendor Value Survey", in which Red Hat ranked #1 in value for the second year in a row. Red Hat stock became part of the NASDAQ-100 on December 19, 2005.

Red Hat acquired open-source middleware provider JBoss on June 5, 2006, and JBoss became a division of Red Hat. On September 18, 2006, Red Hat released the Red Hat Application Stack, which integrated the JBoss technology and which was certified by other well-known software vendors. On December 12, 2006, Red Hat stock moved from trading on NASDAQ (RHAT) to the New York Stock Exchange (RHT). In 2007 Red Hat acquired MetaMatrix and made an agreement with Exadel to distribute its software.

On March 15, 2007, Red Hat released Red Hat Enterprise Linux 5, and in June acquired Mobicents. On March 13, 2008, Red Hat acquired Amentra, a provider of systems integration services for service-oriented architecture, business process management, systems development and enterprise data services.

On July 27, 2009, Red Hat replaced CIT Group in Standard and Poor's 500 stock index, a diversified index of 500 leading companies of the U.S. economy. This was reported as a major milestone for Linux.

On December 15, 2009, it was reported that Red Hat will pay  to settle a class action lawsuit related to the restatement of financial results from July 2004. The suit had been pending in U.S. District Court for the Eastern District of North Carolina.

The second phase involves "expansion into new technologies such as software virtualization and technology cloud offerings".

On August 25, 2011, Red Hat announced it would move about 600 employees from the N.C. State Centennial Campus to the Two Progress Plaza building. A ribbon cutting ceremony was held June 24, 2013, in the re-branded Red Hat Headquarters.

In 2012, Red Hat became the first one-billion dollar open-source company, reaching  in annual revenue during its fiscal year. Red Hat passed the $2 billion benchmark in 2015.  the company's annual revenue was nearly $3 billion.

On October 16, 2015, Red Hat announced its acquisition of IT automation startup Ansible, rumored for an estimated US$100 million.

In June 2017, Red Hat announced Red Hat Hyperconverged Infrastructure (RHHI) 1.0 software product

In May 2018, Red Hat acquired CoreOS.

IBM subsidiary 
On October 28, 2018, IBM announced its intent to acquire Red Hat for US$34 billion, in one of its largest-ever acquisitions. The company will operate out of IBM's Hybrid Cloud division.

Six months later, on May 3, 2019, the US Department of Justice concluded its review of IBM's proposed Red Hat acquisition, and according to Steven J. Vaughan-Nichols "essentially approved the IBM/Red Hat deal". The acquisition was closed on July 9, 2019.

Fedora Project

Red Hat is primary sponsor of Fedora Project, a community-supported free software project that aims to promote the rapid progress of free and open-source software and content.

Business model
Red Hat operates on a business model based on open-source software, development within a community, professional quality assurance, and subscription-based customer support. They produce open-source code so that more programmers can make adaptations and improvements.

Red Hat sells subscriptions for the support, training, and integration services that help customers in using their open-source software products. Customers pay one set price for unlimited access to services such as Red Hat Network and up to 24/7 support.

In September 2014, however, CEO Jim Whitehurst announced that Red Hat was "in the midst of a major shift from client-server to cloud-mobile".

Rich Bynum, a member of Red Hat's legal team, attributes Linux's success and rapid development partially to open-source business models, including Red Hat's.

Programs and projects

One Laptop per Child
Red Hat engineers worked with the One Laptop per Child initiative (a non-profit organization established by members of the MIT Media Lab) to design and produce an inexpensive laptop and try to provide every child in the world with access to open communication, open knowledge, and open learning. The XO-4 laptop, the last machine the project produced (in 2012), runs a slimmed-down version of Fedora 17 as its operating system.

KVM 
Avi Kivity began the development of KVM in mid-2006 at Qumranet, a technology startup company that was acquired by Red Hat in 2008.

GNOME 
Red Hat is the largest contributor to the GNOME desktop environment. It has several employees working full-time on Evolution, the official personal information manager for GNOME.

systemd 
Init system and system/service manager for Linux systems.

PulseAudio 
Network-capable sound server program distributed via the freedesktop.org project.

Dogtail
Dogtail, an open-source automated graphical user interface (GUI) test framework initially developed by Red Hat, consists of free software released under the GNU General Public License (GPL) and is written in Python. It allows developers to build and test their applications. Red Hat announced the release of Dogtail at the 2006 Red Hat Summit.

MRG 
Red Hat MRG is a clustering product intended for integrated high-performance computing (HPC). The acronym MRG stands for "Messaging Realtime Grid".

Red Hat Enterprise MRG replaces the kernel of Red Hat Enterprise Linux RHEL, a Linux distribution developed by Red Hat, in order to provide extra support for real-time computing, together with middleware support for message brokerage and scheduling workload to local or remote virtual machines, grid computing, and cloud computing.

, Red Hat works with the Condor High-Throughput Computing System community and also provides support for the software.

The Tuna performance-monitoring tool runs in the MRG environment.

Opensource.com
Red Hat produces the online publication Opensource.com since January 20, 2010. The site highlights ways open-source principles apply in domains other than software development. The site tracks the application of open-source philosophy to business, education, government, law, health, and life.

The company originally produced a newsletter called Under the Brim. Wide Open magazine first appeared in March 2004, as a means for Red Hat to share technical content with subscribers on a regular basis. The Under the Brim newsletter and Wide Open magazine merged in November 2004, to become Red Hat Magazine. In January 2010, Red Hat Magazine became Opensource.com.

Red Hat Exchange
In 2007, Red Hat announced that it had reached an agreement with some free software and open-source (FOSS) companies that allowed it to make a distribution portal called Red Hat Exchange, reselling FOSS software with the original branding intact. However, by 2010, Red Hat had abandoned the Exchange program to focus their efforts more on their Open Source Channel Alliance which began in April 2009.

Red Hat Single Sign On 
Red Hat Single Sign On is a software product to allow single sign-on with Identity Management and Access Management aimed at modern applications and services. There is an ongoing Open source project alongside Red Hat SSO, that is Keycloak. Keycloak is basically the community version from Red Hat SSO. Red Hat Single Sign On 7.3 is the latest version available.

Red Hat Subscription Management
Red Hat Subscription Management (RHSM) combines content delivery with subscription management.

Ceph Storage
Red Hat is the largest contributor to the CEPH Storage Red Hat Ceph Storage (SDS) project : Block, File & Object Storage which runs on industry-standard x86 servers and Ethernet IP.

Ceph aims primarily for completely distributed operation without a single point of failure, scalable to the exabyte level.

Ceph replicates data and makes it fault-tolerant, using commodity hardware and requiring no specific hardware support. Ceph's system offers disaster recovery and data redundancy through techniques such as replication, erasure coding, snapshots and storage cloning. As a result of its design, the system is both self-healing and self-managing, aiming to minimize administration time and other costs.

In this way, administrators have a single, consolidated system that avoids silos and collects the storage within a common management framework. Ceph consolidates several storage use cases and improves resource utilization. It also lets an organization deploy servers where needed.

OpenShift
Red Hat operates OpenShift, a cloud computing platform as a service, supporting applications written in Node.js, PHP, Perl, Python, Ruby, JavaEE and more.

On July 31, 2018, Red Hat announced the release of Istio 1.0, a microservices management program used in tandem with the Kubernetes platform. The software purports to provide "traffic management, service identity and security, policy enforcement and telemetry" services in order to streamline Kubernetes use under the various Fedora-based operating systems. Red Hat's Brian Redbeard Harring described Istio as "aiming to be a control plane, similar to the Kubernetes control plane, for configuring a series of proxy servers that get injected between application components". Also Red Hat is the second largest contributor to Kubernetes code itself, after Google.

OpenStack
Red Hat markets a version of OpenStack which helps manage a data center in the manner of cloud computing.

CloudForms
Red Hat CloudForms provides management of virtual machines, instances and containers based on VMware vSphere, Red Hat Virtualization, Microsoft Hyper-V, OpenStack, Amazon EC2, Google Cloud Platform, Microsoft Azure, and Red Hat OpenShift. CloudForms is based on the ManageIQ project that Red Hat open sourced. Code in ManageIQ is from the over  acquisition of ManageIQ in 2012.

CoreOS
Container Linux (formerly CoreOS Linux) is a discontinued open-source lightweight operating system based on the Linux kernel and designed for providing infrastructure to clustered deployments. As an operating system, Container Linux provided only the minimal functionality required for deploying applications inside software containers, together with built-in mechanisms for service discovery and configuration sharing.

LibreOffice
Red Hat contributes, with several software developers, to LibreOffice, a free and open-source office suite.

Other FOSS projects 
Red Hat has some employees working full-time on other free and open-source software projects that are not Red Hat products, such as two full-time employees working on the free software radeon (David Airlie and Jerome Glisse) and one full-time employee working on the free software nouveau graphic drivers. Another such project is AeroGear, an open-source project that brings security and development expertise to cross-platform enterprise mobile development.

Red Hat also organises "Open Source Day" events where multiple partners show their open-source technologies.

Xorg 
Red Hat is one of the largest contributors to the X Window System.

Utilities and tools 

Subscribers have access to:
 Red Hat Developer Toolset (DTS) – performance analysis and development tools
 Red Hat Software Collections (RHSCL) 

Over and above Red Hat's major products and acquisitions, Red Hat programmers have produced software programming-tools and utilities to supplement standard Unix and Linux software. Some of these Red Hat "products" have found their way from specifically Red Hat operating environments via open-source channels to a wider community. Such utilities include:
 Disk Druid – for disk partitioning
 rpm – for package management
 sos (son of sysreport) – tools for collecting information on system hardware and configuration.
 sosreport – reports system hardware and configuration details
 SystemTap – tracing tool for Linux kernels, developed with IBM, Hitachi, Oracle and Intel
 NetworkManager

The Red Hat website lists the organization's major involvements in free and open-source software projects.

Community projects under the aegis of Red Hat include:
 the Pulp application for software repository management.

Subsidiaries

Red Hat Czech

Red Hat Czech s.r.o. is a research and development arm of Red Hat, based in Brno, Czech Republic. The subsidiary was formed in 2006 and has 1,180 employees (2019). Red Hat chose to enter the Czech Republic in 2006 over other locations due to the country's embrace of open-source. The subsidiary expanded in 2017 to a second location in the Brno Technology Park to accommodate an additional 350 employees.

In 2016, Red Hat Czech reported revenue of CZK 1,002 million (FY 2016), and net income of CZK 123 million (FY 2016), with assets of CZK 420 million (FY 2016)|CZK 325 million (FY 2015).

The group was named the "Most progressive employer of the year" in the Czech Republic in 2010, and the "Best Employer in the Czech Republic" for large scale companies in 2011 by Aon.

Red Hat India
In 2000, Red Hat created the subsidiary Red Hat India to deliver Red Hat software, support, and services to Indian customers. Colin Tenwick, former vice president and general manager of Red Hat EMEA, said Red Hat India was opened "in response to the rapid adoption of Red Hat Linux in the subcontinent. Demand for open-source solutions from the Indian markets is rising and Red Hat wants to play a major role in this region." Red Hat India has worked with local companies to enable adoption of open-source technology in both government and education.

In 2006, Red Hat India had a distribution network of more than 70 channel partners spanning 27 cities across India. Red Hat India's channel partners included MarkCraft Solutions, Ashtech Infotech Pvt Ltd., Efensys Technologies, Embee Software, Allied Digital Services, and Softcell Technologies. Distributors include Integra Micro Systems and Ingram Micro.

Mergers and acquisitions
Red Hat's first major acquisition involved Delix Computer GmbH-Linux Div, the Linux-based operating-system division of Delix Computer, a German computer company, on July 30, 1999.

Michael Tiemann, co-founder of Cygnus, served as the chief technical officer of Red Hat after the acquisition. Red Hat made the most acquisitions in 2000 with five: Cygnus Solutions, Bluecurve, Wirespeed Communications, Hell's Kitchen Systems, and C2Net.

On December 14, 1998, Red Hat made its first divestment, when Intel and Netscape acquired undisclosed minority stakes in the company. The next year, on March 9, 1999, Compaq, IBM, Dell and Novell each acquired undisclosed minority stakes in Red Hat.

Acquisitions

Divestitures

References

External links

 
 Red Hat contributions

 
1993 establishments in North Carolina
1999 initial public offerings
2019 mergers and acquisitions
Cloud computing providers
Companies based in Raleigh, North Carolina
Software companies established in 1993
American companies established in 1993
Companies formerly listed on the Nasdaq
Companies formerly listed on the New York Stock Exchange
Software companies based in North Carolina
Free software companies
GNOME companies
Linux companies
Research Triangle
IBM acquisitions
IBM subsidiaries
Software companies of the United States